The Quiet Girl is a 2022 Irish coming-of-age drama film written and directed by Colm Bairéad. The dialogue is mostly in Irish. Set in 1981, the film follows a withdrawn nine-year-old girl who experiences a loving home for the first time when she spends the summer on a farm with distant relatives in Rinn Gaeltacht, County Waterford. The film was nominated for Best International Feature Film at the 95th Academy Awards.

Plot
In the summer of 1981, nine-year-old Cáit is one of many siblings, living with her impoverished and neglectful parents in rural Ireland. We see that she is afraid in some way, hiding in her bedroom. We see her struggling at school, and being shamed when a cup of tea is spilled onto her lap, trying to hide it. With her mother pregnant again, it is decided to send their quiet daughter away to live with middle-aged distant cousin Eibhlín Cinnsealach (Kinsella) and her husband Seán. 

As Cáit arrived at the Cinnsealach home with no luggage, Eibhlín immediately welcomes her into the Cinnsealach home, showing her love and teaching her how to do chores around the house and farm. She also shows Cáit a well on the property, claiming that the water has healing powers, while warning that the well is deep and to exercise caution when retrieving water from it. She says not to speak of it and Cáit asks, "Is it a secret?"  Eibhlín places her in a spare bedroom and again we see Cáit fearing an adult coming into the room. The girl is seen to be wetting the bed. Initially, Eibhlín dresses her with boys' clothes left in the wardrobe. She later buys Cáit new girls' clothes.

Seán, on the other hand, is withdrawn and initially acts coldly towards his foster daughter. One day when Eibhlín is away, Cáit accompanies Seán to the far side of the farm, the latter cleaning the milking parlour. While he is occupied, Cáit wanders off. Once Seán notices her absence, he panics and searches for her on the property. After finding her, he scolds her and orders her to never wander off again. Frightened by his sudden bout of anger, Cáit runs back to the house. Seán expresses remorse and begins to make an effort to bond with Cáit. He gets her to run to fetch the mail, turning it into a pleasant ritual, praising her speed. Slowly, the girl opens up to her foster father, and the two become close.

One day, the Cinnsealach family attend a wake. Seeing Cáit getting restless at the event while Eibhlín and Seán comfort their friends, a gossipy neighbour offers to look after her for a couple of hours. Eibhlín hesitates, but agrees. While the woman and Cáit walk together, the former reveals that the Cinnsealachs had a young son who drowned in the family slurry pit some years before Cáit's arrival.

When the Cinnsealachs later pick Cáit up from the neighbour's house, they notice the girl's withdrawn demeanour and ask what the neighbour said to her. Cáit tells them the truth, which quietly upsets the older couple, but they do not deny the neighbour's story.

Over a month into her stay, Cáit's mother has given birth and has requested for the Cinnsealachs to return Cáit in time for the start of the school year. Cáit, Eibhlín and Seán each express their subdued sadness at having to part, but the couple agree to drive Cáit back to her family. Cáit sneaks off to the well to fetch water but falls in, overwhelmed by her rapidly filling bucket. A distressed Eibhlín, searching for Cáit, finds her soaked and shivering and comforts her. She develops a cold.

A few days later, Eibhlín and Seán drive Cáit back to her home. Her mother barely acknowledges her daughter's return, and her father immediately chastises Cáit for sneezing. After a tension-filled conversation between the adults, with Eibhlín telling Cáit's parents that the girl is welcome to stay with them at any time, they reluctantly bid farewell to Cáit and begin to drive off.

While watching the car disappear down the long driveway, Cáit suddenly sprints toward it, managing to catch up to the couple as Seán is closing the gate. The foster father and daughter embrace, while Eibhlín sobs quietly in the car. As Cáit looks over Seán's shoulder, she sees her father angrily marching toward them and says "Daddy" to alert Seán to his presence. After a brief pause, she says "Daddy" again.

Cast
 Catherine Clinch as Cáit
 Carrie Crowley as Eibhlín Kinsella
 Andrew Bennett as Seán Kinsella
 Michael Patric as Da
 Kate Nic Chonaonaigh as Mam

Production

The Quiet Girl is based on Foster, a 2010 novella in English by Claire Keegan. The film was originally titled Fanacht ("Waiting"). It was filmed in Dublin and County Meath, with Meath locations including Summerhill, Moynalvey (including Fagan's Pub), Curraghtown, Garlow Cross, Trim, and Clonymeath.

Release

The Quiet Girl premiered at the Berlinale on 11 February 2022. It won a Crystal Bear from the Generation Kplus International Jury for Best Film and received a special mention from the children's jury. The jury stated that "It is a film with a delicate story full of details about childhood, grief, parenthood and rebuilding a family. The very strong narrative is combined with a stunning cinematography. The sound and the images create a unique atmosphere."

It was also shown at the 2022 Dublin International Film Festival on 23 February, and at the Glasgow Film Festival in March 2022. It went on general release in Ireland on 12 May 2022. It was also selected for the 'World Cinema' section of 27th Busan International Film Festival to be screened in October 2022.

Reception 
It broke box office records for the opening weekend of an Irish-language film and became the highest-grossing Irish-language film of all time. 

On Rotten Tomatoes the film has a 96% approval rating based on reviews from 97 critics, with an average rating of 8.7/10. The website's consensus reads, "A remarkable debut for writer-director Colm Bairéad, The Quiet Girl offers a deceptively simple reminder that the smallest stories can leave a large emotional impact." On Metacritic the film has a weighted average score of 88 out of 100 based on 24 critic reviews, indicating "universal acclaim".

Accolades 
The Quiet Girl received 11 nominations at the 18th Irish Film & Television Awards (IFTAs) in March 2022, and won in seven categories. The film was the first Irish-language film to showcase at the Berlin Film Festival and win the Best Film award at IFTAs. In December 2022 the film became the first Irish-language film to be shortlisted for an Oscar in the Best International Feature Film category.

On 24 January 2023, the film was nominated for the Academy Award for Best International Feature Film at the 95th Academy Awards, becoming the first Irish film to be nominated in the category's history.

See also
 List of submissions to the 95th Academy Awards for Best International Feature Film
 List of Irish submissions for the Academy Award for Best International Feature Film

References

External links
 
 

2022 films
2022 drama films
Films set in 1981
Films set in Ireland
Films set on farms
Films shot in County Meath
Irish-language films
Irish coming-of-age drama films
2020s coming-of-age drama films
English-language Irish films
Films about adoption
Films set in the 1980s